Batuša is a village in the municipality of Malo Crniće, Serbia. According to the 2011 census, the village has a population of 509 people, down from 606 in 2002.

References

Populated places in Braničevo District